Utricularia rigida is a small to medium-sized perennial, rheophytic carnivorous plant that belongs to the genus Utricularia. U. rigida is endemic to western tropical Africa, where it can be found in Côte d'Ivoire, Guinea, Guinea-Bissau, Mali, Nigeria, Senegal, and Sierra Leone. It was originally described and published by Ludwig Benjamin in 1847. It is distinguished from the other species in the section, U. tetraloba, by having only two lower lip corolla lobes as opposed to U. tetraloba's four.

See also 
 List of Utricularia species

References

External links

Carnivorous plants of Africa
Flora of Ivory Coast
Flora of Guinea
Flora of Guinea-Bissau
Flora of Mali
Flora of Nigeria
Flora of Senegal
Flora of Sierra Leone
rigida